A turbine is a rotary mechanical device that extracts energy from a fluid flow.

Turbine may also refer to:

In software
Turbine, Inc., a software company
Apache Turbine, a rapid development web application framework

Ships
Turbine-class destroyer, a class of Italian warships mainly used during World War II 
Italian destroyer Turbine, a World War I destroyer of the Nembo class

Other uses
TURBINE (US government project)
Turbine, Ontario
1. FFC Turbine Potsdam, a women's football team in Potsdam, Germany
Mohamed Tabarsi, a character nicknamed Turbine in the Japanese Shaman King manga series
Turbine interchange, a road interchange between two freeways
Sunday Tribune, a defunct Irish newspaper, informally called the Turbine
Turbine (album), a 1994 album by The Walk
Turbines (album), a 2013 album by Tunng
A former roller coaster at Walibi Belgium